Ivan Kornil'yevich Pokrovsky (known in the Duma as Pokrovsky 1st; ; 1845, Chelyabinsk — after 1912) was a podporuchik of Imperial Russian Army, provincial secretary, entrepreneur, a deputy of Chelyabinsk City Duma, a party "agent" of the Constitutional Democratic Party in Chelyabinsk and a deputy of the Third Imperial Duma from 1907 to 1912. He also lived and worked in Belgium, soon after that he owned gold mines in the Urals and was a co-owner of a distillery and a sugar factory. His brother, Vladimir, was the mayor of Chelyabinsk.

Literature 
 Покровский Иван Корнильевич (in Russian) // Государственная дума Российской империи: 1906—1917 / Б. Ю. Иванов, А. А. Комзолова, И. С. Ряховская. — Москва: РОССПЭН, 2008. — P. 466. — 735 p. — .
 Покровскій (in Russian) // Члены Государственной Думы (портреты и биографии). Третий созыв. 1907—1912 гг. / Сост. М. М. Боиович. — М., 1913. — P. 209. — 526 p. (in Russian)
 Боже В. С. Покровский Иван Корнильевич (in Russian) // Челябинск: Энциклопедия / Составители: В. С. Боже, В. А. Черноземцев. — Изд. испр. и доп. — Челябинск: Каменный пояс, 2001. — P. 635. — 1112 p. — .

1845 births
Year of death unknown
Businesspeople from Chelyabinsk
People from Chelyabinsky Uyezd
Russian Constitutional Democratic Party members
Members of the 3rd State Duma of the Russian Empire
Politicians from Chelyabinsk